Guyanés is a soft, salty, white Cow's milk cheese originating from the Guayana Region in the south east of Venezuela.

See also
 List of cheeses

References

Cow's-milk cheeses

Venezuelan cheeses